William Poe may refer to:
 William F. Poe, mayor of Tampa, Florida
 William Henry Leonard Poe, American sailor and amateur poet